Rolled r or rolling r refers to consonant sounds pronounced with a vibrating tongue or uvula: